Tramway line T11 Express (known as the Tangentielle Nord and Tram Express Nord during the planning phase) is a suburban tram-train line in France.

Route
It will have interchanges with existing SNCF Transilien train lines, trams, metro, and Réseau Express Régional (RER) lines A, B, C, D and E. There will be six new stations and eight interchange stations.

Project
The project, which was granted approval in May 2008, was planned by Syndicat des transports d'Île-de-France (STIF) but also jointly managed by SNCF and Réseau Ferré de France (RFF).

The parisian tramway line 11 will be built in two phases.

The total line's overall cost is estimated to be around €1.5 billion.

See also
Grande Ceinture line
Chemin de fer de Petite Ceinture
Grande ceinture Ouest

References

Rail transport in Paris
Line 11
Railway lines opened in 2017
2017 establishments in France